Myogenin, is a transcriptional activator encoded by the MYOG gene.
Myogenin is a muscle-specific basic-helix-loop-helix (bHLH) transcription factor involved in the coordination of skeletal muscle development or myogenesis and repair.  Myogenin is a member of the MyoD family of transcription factors, which also includes MyoD, Myf5, and MRF4.

In mice, myogenin is essential for the development of functional skeletal muscle. Myogenin is required for the proper differentiation of most myogenic precursor cells during the process of myogenesis. When the DNA coding for myogenin was knocked out of the mouse genome, severe skeletal muscle defects were observed.  Mice lacking both copies of myogenin (homozygous-null) suffer from perinatal lethality due to the lack of mature secondary skeletal muscle fibers throughout the body.

In cell culture, myogenin can induce myogenesis in a variety of non-muscle cell types.

Interactions 
Myogenin has been shown to interact with:
 MDFI,
 POLR2C, 
 Serum response factor 
 Sp1 transcription factor,  and
 TCF3.

References

Further reading

External links 
 

Gene expression
Human proteins